Policewala is a 1993 Indian Hindi-language coming-of-age action thriller film directed by Sikander Bharti and produced by Sundeep Kumar. This movie was released under the banner of Sandeep Films.

Plot
Honest and dutiful Police officer Rakesh was murdered by a mafia boss. Rakaes's son Jimmi joins in the police force and becomes an undercover cop. He acted as an inmate and infiltrates into the gang of criminals to collect evidence against Mafia bosses. There are three top notorious leaders in the city who had killed Jimmi's father. Police arrest two of them, Tejeswar and Ranu, by the secret help of Jimmi. But the third one knows Jimmi is actually a CBI officer in plain clothes.

Cast
 Chunky Pandey as CBI Officer Jagmohan / Jimmy 
 Sonam as Meenakshi
 Vinod Mehra as Inspector Prabhakar
 Amjad Khan as Judge 
 Shakti Kapoor as Rajendra Chakravarty / Ronu Dada
 Kiran Kumar as Tejeshwar Chaudhary
 Om Shivpuri as Police Commissioner
 Parikshat Sahni as Inspector Rakesh 
 Anjana Mumtaz as Jimmy's Mother
 Viju Khote as Police Inspector
 Tej Sapru
 Gurbachan Singh as Shera
 Ishrat Ali as John
 Mac Mohan as Micheal
 Sudhir as Daniel
 Arun Bakshi as Train Passenger

Soundtrack

References

External links
 

1993 films
Indian crime action films
1990s crime action films
1990s Hindi-language films
Films scored by Bappi Lahiri